Penicuik is one of the six wards used to elect members of the Midlothian Council. It elects three Councillors.

Councillors

Election results

2018 by-election

2017 election
2017 Midlothian Council election

2012 election
2012 Midlothian Council election

2007 election
2007 Midlothian Council election

References

Wards of Midlothian
Penicuik